The NATO Senior Civilian Representative in Afghanistan represents the political leadership of the NATO Alliance in Kabul, Afghanistan.

The Senior Civilian Representative carries forward the Alliance's political-military objectives in Afghanistan, liaising with the Afghan Government, civil society, representatives of the international community and neighbouring countries. The position was created in 2003.

List of Senior Civilian Representatives
2003–2006: Hikmet Çetin (Turkey)
2006–2007: Daan Everts (Netherlands)
2008: Maurits Jochems (Netherlands) (acting)
2008–2010: Fernando Gentilini (Italy)
2010–2011: Mark Sedwill (United Kingdom)
2011–2012: Simon Gass (United Kingdom)
2012–2015: Maurits Jochems (Netherlands)
2015–2016: Ambassador Ismail Aramaz, (Turkey)
2017-2019: Ambassador Cornelius Zimmermann, (Germany)
2019-2020: Ambassador Nicholas Kay, (United Kingdom)
2020-present: Ambassador Stefano Pontecorvo, (Italy)

References

 
Afghanistan politics-related lists 
Afghanistan diplomacy-related lists
Afghan military-related lists